Eugenijus Sabutis (born 10 September 1975 in Jonava) is a Lithuanian politician and since 2016 Mayor of Jonava.

Biography 
Eugenijus Sabutis graduated from Jonava Gymnasium in 1994 and then graduated from Vytautas Magnus University.

Sabutis was active in the Social Democratic Young Organization. A member of the Social Democratic Party of Lithuania, he was elected to the municipal council of Jonava district municipality in 2015. In 2015, he became a vice-mayor of Jonava district municipality by the municipal council. At the end of 2016, former mayor Mindaugas Sinkevičius was appointed as the Minister of Economy on Skvernelis Cabinet, the 17th cabinet of the Republic of Lithuania. Since December 2016 he is head of the Jonava district municipality.

Family 
Sabutis is married and has a son.

References 

1975 births
Living people
Mayors of places in Lithuania
Politicians from Jonava
Vice-Mayors of Jonava
Social Democratic Party of Lithuania politicians
Lithuanian jurists
Vytautas Magnus University alumni